Hamilton Apartments may refer to:

Hamilton Apartments (West Memphis, Arkansas), listed on the National Register of Historic Places in Crittenden County, Arkansas
Hamilton Apartments (Lancaster, Pennsylvania), listed on the National Register of Historic Places in Lancaster County, Pennsylvania
Hamilton Apartments (Fort Worth, Texas), listed on the National Register of Historic Places in Tarrant County, Texas